The 16th Asian Junior Table Tennis Championships 2010 were held in Bangkok, Thailand, from  21 to 25 July 2010. It was organised by the  Table Tennis Association of Thailand under the authority of the Asian Table Tennis Union (ATTU).

Medal summary

Events

Medal table

See also

2010 World Junior Table Tennis Championships
Asian Table Tennis Championships
Asian Table Tennis Union

References

Asian Junior and Cadet Table Tennis Championships
Asian Junior and Cadet Table Tennis Championships
Asian Junior and Cadet Table Tennis Championships
Asian Junior and Cadet Table Tennis Championships
Table tennis competitions in Thailand
International sports competitions hosted by Thailand
Asian Junior and Cadet Table Tennis Championships